Walkabout Resources is an Australian-based minerals developer with projects in Tanzania, Northern Ireland, Scotland and Namibia.

History
Founded in Perth, Western Australia, Walkabout Resources entered the Australian Securities Exchange in 2011 through a reverse listing with Nimrodel Resources. The company’s stated goal is to explore and develop diverse mineral projects in Africa.

Early exploration activity included the Takatokwane coal project in Botswana and two projects in Tanzania – copper at Kigoma and platinum group elements at Makete.

The company was accepted into the European Raw Materials Alliance in May 2021.

Thomas Murrell was a board member and major shareholder of the company from May 2015 to March 2019, helping to raise funds for and promote Walkabout's transition from a coal focus to graphite exploration in Tanzania.

Operations

Lindi Jumbo
Walkabout Resources is developing the Lindi Jumbo graphite project in south-east Tanzania, 200km from the port of Mtwara.
The deposit contains high-grade natural large flake graphite concentrate, with up to 50% of the total graphite in the super jumbo (+500µm) and jumbo (+300µm) categories. Debt funding with CRDB Bank of Tanzania was secured in April 2021 and construction is due to begin following the implementation of formal documentation.

Other projects
As of 2021, Walkabout Resources is carrying out exploration programmes for gold and base metals in Northern Ireland, Scotland and Tanzania, and for lithium in Namibia.

References

External links

Companies based in Perth, Western Australia
Companies listed on the Australian Securities Exchange
Mining companies of Australia
Non-renewable resource companies established in 2011
2011 establishments in Australia